Keith Sweat Live is the first live album by American singer 'Keith Sweat. Recorded live in Washington, D.C., it was released by Elektra Records on February 4, 2003.

Critical reception

AllMusic editor Jonathan Widran rated the album three stars out of five. He felt that "the way Sweat and his band textures backing vocals makes this something of a church experience, with an urgent love message being conveyed by Pastor Keith as the choir echoes in the background [...] You may not sweat from over-groovin', but the passionate heat his productions stir up may do the trick."

Track listing
"Something Just Aint Right"  – 3:20
"Don't Stop Your Love"  – 2:33
"Freak Me (Interlude)" (featuring Lil 'G)  – 2:05
"Make It Last Forever"  (featuring Calandra Glenn) – 3:15
"Right and Wrong Way"  – 2:40
"How Deep Is Your Love"  – 3:25
"Merry Go Round"  – 4:29
"I Want Her"  – 4:42
"Show Me the Way (Revival)"  – 4:14
"I'll Give All My Love to You" (featuring Monica)  – 5:07
"Interlude"  – 1:54
"My Body"   (featuring Gerald Levert & Johnny Gill) – 4:17
"Nobody" (featuring Athena Cage)  – 6:44
"Twisted"  – 5:33
"(There You Go) Tellin' Me No Again"    – 6:23

Personnel
 Keith Sweat – Producer
 Darrell Adams – Background Vocals
 Annamaria DiSanto – Photography
 Dr. David Evans – Performer
 Andre Harris – Performer
 Randy Hutchinson – Performer
 Keith Robinson – Background Vocals, Performer
 Calandra Glenn – Background Vocals, Performer

Charts

References 

Keith Sweat albums
2003 live albums
Elektra Records live albums